City College Manchester was a network of further education campuses in Manchester, England.

History
The network was formed in the late 20th century when institutions in Central Manchester, Fielden Park, Arden and Wythenshawe merged to form City College Manchester. It was the largest provider of "Offender Learning" in the Greater Manchester region.

The college merged with Manchester College of Arts and Technology (MANCAT) to create an 80,000 student 'supercollege' known as The Manchester College in August 2008. The principal of MANCAT Peter Tavernor was appointed as head of The Manchester College.

Campuses
City College had five campuses, the three main ones being Abraham Moss in Crumpsall, Northenden, and City Campus. Business courses were run at the smaller Fielden Campus in West Didsbury, and the college's Arden School of Theatre is in Ardwick. Courses for adults were run at the Wythenshawe Forum. The college had a large International Office in Manchester city centre.

See also
Shena Simon Campus

References

 
Defunct universities and colleges in the United Kingdom
Further education colleges in Manchester
Educational institutions disestablished in 2008
2008 disestablishments in England